Ngô Quang Huy (born 10 March 1984) is a former professional tennis player.

A member of the Vietnam Davis Cup team from 2003 to 2014, Ngô appeared in a total of 28 ties for his country and secured 13 wins. He also represented Vietnam in multiple editions of the Southeast Asian Games, where he won four bronze medals.

Ngô spent his professional career competing in ITF Futures tournaments across Asia, but made one ATP Tour main draw appearance, at the 2005 Ho Chi Minh City Open. He received a wildcard to partner Aljoscha Thron in the doubles event and the pair made it through to the quarter-finals.

References

External links
 
 
 

1984 births
Living people
Vietnamese male tennis players
Southeast Asian Games medalists in tennis
Southeast Asian Games bronze medalists for Vietnam
Competitors at the 2003 Southeast Asian Games
Competitors at the 2005 Southeast Asian Games
Competitors at the 2007 Southeast Asian Games
Competitors at the 2011 Southeast Asian Games